The Mix Tape is a compilation album released by MC Breed. It was released on September 28, 2004 for Ichiban Records and was produced by DJ Crunk Mix and Mark Watson.

Track listing
"Teach My Kids"- 3:51 
"This Is How We Do It, Pt. 1"- 4:23 
"Just Kickin' It"- 3:43 
"Game for Life"- 2:31 
"Real MC"- 3:33 
"Ain't Too Much Worried"- 2:56 
"Night Life"- 2:58 
"Comin Real Again"- 2:21 
"Seven Years"- 3:45 
"One Time"- 2:16 
"Say What"- 4:19 
"Everyday Ho"- 2:56  
"Conclusions"- 4:40 
"Tight"- 2:55 
"Gotta Get Mine"- 4:17 
"Late Night Creep"- 2:04 
"What You Want"- 4:18 
"Ain't No Future in Yo Frontin'"- 3:50 
"Outro"- 2:34

MC Breed albums
Albums produced by Jazze Pha
2004 mixtape albums
Ichiban Records compilation albums